David Strettell is the founder and owner of New York City’s only independent bookstore for photography, Dashwood Books. He opened the store in 2005. Prior to this, Strettell was Mario Testino’s assistant, and then the cultural director of Magnum Photos for 12 years. He publishes books as well about photography including limited-edition monographs. Strettell is married to Ann Christiansen, and a father of one.

References 

Living people
American businesspeople
American photographers
Year of birth missing (living people)